"Wiedersehen" is the ninth and penultimate episode of the fourth season of the AMC television series Better Call Saul, the spinoff series of Breaking Bad. The episode aired on October 1, 2018, on AMC in the United States. Outside of the United States, the episode premiered on streaming service Netflix in several countries.

Plot
Jimmy McGill and Kim Wexler work a successful scam to replace approved building plans for a Mesa Verde branch in Lubbock, Texas, with plans for a bigger building. On their way home, Jimmy suggests using their skills for more cons, but Kim counsels caution. After Jimmy’s hearing, he discovers from the committee secretary that they have denied his reinstatement. When Jimmy confronts the chairman, he tells Jimmy some of his answers were perceived as insincere, and he can reapply in a year.

When an enraged Jimmy recounts the hearing to Kim, she points out that Jimmy never mentioned Chuck McGill; since their dispute was why Jimmy was suspended, the panel members considered his answers to be disingenuous. Jimmy complains that Kim only "slums" with him when she wants something, but Kim angrily points out that she has been Jimmy's biggest supporter since they first met. That night, Jimmy returns to Kim's apartment and wordlessly starts packing his belongings. Kim asks if he still wants to be a lawyer. He says yes and Kim says she will help.

Lalo Salamanca and Nacho Varga visit Hector Salamanca, who is in a nursing home. Lalo reminds Hector of the time Hector burned down a hotel in Mexico and killed the owner, who had treated Hector disrespectfully. He reveals he kept a souvenir — the front desk concierge bell. He ties the bell to Hector's wheelchair, allowing Hector to communicate more effectively. Lalo takes Nacho to Los Pollos Hermanos so he can meet Gus Fring in person, then asks Nacho to take him to Gus's chicken farm so he can see where the Salamancas receive their drugs after Gus's trucks bring them over the border.

Werner Ziegler's crew blasts the rock preventing construction of the meth lab's elevator, then celebrate because the end of their job is in sight. Werner asks if he can fly to Germany for a weekend with his wife, then come back to finish the work. Instead, Mike Ehrmantraut offers Werner an extra phone call with his wife, which Werner accepts. When Mike receives his morning report from the on-duty security team the next day, he notices dead pixels in some monitor displays. He finds that Werner temporarily disabled the cameras, which permitted him to move through the warehouse undetected. He then cut the padlocks for the doors leading to the roof and escaped by climbing down the building's maintenance ladder.

Production
"Wiedersehen" includes the origin story for Hector Salamanca's bell, an item vitally important to the storylines of both Better Call Saul and Breaking Bad. In addition, it provides backstory details about the character Lalo, who was first named in Breaking Bad, and first appeared in the Better Call Saul episode "Coushatta."

In German, "Wiedersehen" is literally translated as "seeing again", and the expression "auf Wiedersehen" is used to indicate "goodbye" or "farewell".  In this episode, Werner's crew have spray painted the word "Wiedersehen" on the rock they need to blast to make room for the elevator in the underground meth lab, in effect saying "goodbye" to the obstacle that has put them behind schedule.  "Wiedersehen" can also be understood as a reference to Werner's escape, since he is effectively saying goodbye to his crew, to Mike, and to the job of supervising the meth lab's construction.

Reception
"Wiedersehen" received critical acclaim. On Rotten Tomatoes, it garnered a perfect 100% rating with an average score of 9.5/10 based on 14 reviews. The site's critical consensus is, "A feeling of inevitability permeates 'Wiedersehen', a surprisingly mellow and melancholy penultimate episode beautifully realized by Vince Gilligan and Gennifer Hutchison's creative reunion."

Ratings
"Wiedersehen" was watched by 1.35 million viewers on its first broadcast, earning a 0.5 ratings for viewers between 18 and 49, holding steady with ratings from the previous week.

References

External links
 "Wiedersehen" at AMC
 

Better Call Saul (season 4) episodes
Television episodes directed by Vince Gilligan